Patricia 'Trish' Mulvihill is a New York City-based colorist who has worked in the comics industry, working on Batman, 100 Bullets, Wonder Woman, and many other comics. In 2004, she won the Eisner Award for Best Colorist.  Mulvihill started in comics at the age of 28.  Mulvihill's first job for DC Comics was on Wonder Woman.

Bibliography
Mulvihill's work as a colorist includes:

DC Comics
Batman
Vol 1 #572: "Jurisprudence, Part One"  (1999) 
Vol 1 #620-625: "Broken City" (2003–2004)
Batman and Captain America Vol 1 (1996)
Darkstars #10, 15, 16 (1993)
Firebrand Vol. 1 #1-5, 7-9 (1996)
Flashpoint Beyond (2022)
Gotham Girls  Vol 1 #1-5(2002–2003)
Nightwing #41-48, 52, 54-56, 59 (2000–2002)
Superman & Bugs Bunny (2000)
The Spirit #26, 27, 31, 32 (with Brian Bolland, Gene Ha, 2007)
The Spirit Book 5 (with Patricia Mulvihill, Kevin Nowlan, Gene Ha, Nick Cardy, Brian Bolland, Paul Rivoche, 2010)
Wonder Woman #78-196 (1993–2003)
Vertigo
Lady Constantine #1-4 (2003)
Spaceman (with Dave Johnson and Giulia Brusco,  2011)
100 Bullets #15-100 (2000-2009)

Awards
Awards Mulvihill has won or been nominated for include:

 1995: Won the "Best Achievement by a Colorist" Don Thompson Award
 1996: Won the "Best Achievement by a Colorist" Don Thompson Award
 1997: Nominated for the "Best Colorist" Eisner Award, for Wonder Woman, Firebrand and Batman/Captain America
 2001: Nominated for the "Best Colorist" Eisner Award, for 100 Bullets
 2002: Nominated for the "Best Colorist" Eisner Award, for Wonder Woman and 100 Bullets
 2003: Nominated for the "Best Colorist" Eisner Award, for Gotham Girls, Wonder Woman, 100 Bullets, and Lady Constantine
 2004: Won the "Best Colorist" Eisner Award, for Batman, Wonder Woman and 100 Bullets
 2005: Nominated for the "Best Colorist" Harvey Award, for 100 Bullets
 2006: Nominated for the "Best Colorist" Harvey Award, for 100 Bullets
 2009: Nominated for the "Best Coloring" Eisner Award, for 100 Bullets (Vertigo/DC), Joker (DC)

Notes

References

External links

Eisner Award winners for Best Coloring
Living people
Year of birth missing (living people)
Comics colorists